The Hanged Man is a 1964 American made-for-television crime drama film directed by Don Siegel, in which a gunman seeks to avenge the death of his friend, who he believes was murdered. It is considered the second television film in broadcast history. It debuted on NBC on November 18, 1964.

The story is based on Ride the Pink Horse, a 1947 film based on a novel by Dorothy B. Hughes.

Cast
Robert Culp as Harry Pace
Edmond O'Brien as Arnie Seeger
Vera Miles as Lois Seeger
Norman Fell as Gaylord Grebb
Gene Raymond as Whitey Devlin
J. Carrol Naish as Uncle Picaud
Pat Buttram as Otis Honeywell
Brenda Scott as Celine
Edgar Bergen as Hotel Clerk
Al Lettieri as Al
Seymour Cassel as Bellboy
Stan Getz as Himself
Astrud Gilberto as Herself
Archie Moore as Xavier

References

External links
 

1964 films
Films directed by Don Siegel
1964 crime drama films
NBC network original films
American crime drama films
Films based on works by Dorothy B. Hughes
1960s English-language films
1960s American films